The Division of Lilley is an Australian Electoral Division in Queensland.

History

The division was first proclaimed in 1913. The division is named after Sir Charles Lilley, a former Premier of Queensland and a former Chief Justice in the Supreme Court of Queensland.

The Division of Lilley includes sparsely populated areas of Brisbane Airport, tidal wetlands around Boondall, and industrial areas around Pinkenba.

It was held by the Liberal Party and its antecedents for all but four terms from 1913 to 1980. However, since 1980, it has tended to be a marginal Labor seat. It is currently represented by Labor MP Anika Wells. Notable former members include former Treasurer, former Deputy Leader of the Labor Party and Deputy Prime Minister, Wayne Swan, as well as George Mackay, who served as Speaker of the Australian House of Representatives during the first term of the Lyons Government, and Kevin Cairns, a minister in the McMahon government.

Boundaries
Since 1984, federal electoral division boundaries in Australia have been determined at redistributions by a redistribution committee appointed by the Australian Electoral Commission. Redistributions occur for the boundaries of divisions in a particular state, and they occur every seven years, or sooner if a state's representation entitlement changes or when divisions of a state are malapportioned.

Lilley stretches from Nundah in the south to the bayside suburbs of Sandgate and Brighton in the north, and as far west as Everton Park.

Lilley currently covers the north-eastern part of the City of Brisbane local government area, and includes Banyo, Boondall, Brighton, Chermside, Deagon, Geebung, Kedron, Northgate, Nudgee, Nundah, Pinkenba, Sandgate, Shorncliffe, Taigum, Virginia, Wavell Heights, Zillmere, and Aspley.

Members

Election results

References

External links
 Division of Lilley (Qld) — Australian Electoral Commission

Electoral divisions of Australia
Constituencies established in 1913
1913 establishments in Australia
Federal politics in Queensland